The Foton Smart Smurf E7 and the shorter Foton Smart Smurf E5 is an electric light, commercial 4/5-door van designed and produced by the Chinese automaker Foton Motor since 2022.

Overview
The Smart Smurf E5 and E7 was launched in China on June 1, 2022. The Smart Smurf E5 and E7 is an fully electric urban logistics van by Foton, specially designed for the needs of urban logistics and distribution.

Specifications

JMC E-Lushun
The JMC E-Lushun by Jiangling Motors is a rebadged variant of the Foton Smart Smurf E7. Launched in November 2022 for the 2023 model year, It features a 41.86 kW battery by CATL and ABS plus EBD. The electric motor has an maximum output of 110 kW and 225N·m of torque with the top speed being .

New Gonow Aoteng
The Gonow Aoteng (新吉奥 奥腾) pure electric logistics panel van sold by New Gonow is another rebadged electric variant of the Foton Smart Smurf E7.  The Aoteng battery options are CATL supplied 50.23kWh, Suzhou Yuliang Battery Co.,Ltd. supplied 45.33kWh, and Gotion High tech Co Ltd supplied 41.93kWh Lithium Iron Phosphate Batteries with the maximum pure electric CLTC range of 305km.

References

External links
 Foton official site

Electric vans
Cars introduced in 2022
2020s cars
Front-wheel-drive vehicles